Sagir David Arce Chávez (born February 15, 2002) is a professional footballer who plays as an attacking midfielder. Born in the United States, he represented the Mexico national under-21 team.

Career

Club
Arce made his professional debut on September 3, 2019, when he replaced Fernando Aristeguieta in the 77th minute of a 2–0 Copa MX win at home against Cimarrones de Sonora. On September 25, 2019, Arce debuted in the Liga MX when he came in for Aldo Rocha in the 81st minute of a 3–2 defeat to Club Tijuana.

International
Due to his dual citizenship, Arce is eligible to represent both Mexico and the United States. He reportedly decided to represent the United States and has been part of several United States U17 camps since 2018, playing for the team on several friendly matches and youth tournaments.

Career statistics

Club

References

External links
 
 

2002 births
Living people
American soccer players
Mexican footballers
Association football forwards
American sportspeople of Mexican descent
United States men's youth international soccer players
Atlético Morelia players
Mazatlán F.C. footballers
Liga MX players
Soccer players from Kansas City, Missouri